Siswa is a constituency of the Uttar Pradesh Legislative Assembly covering the city of Siswa in the Maharajganj district of Uttar Pradesh, India.

Siswa is one of five assembly constituencies in the Maharajganj Lok Sabha constituency. Since 2008, this assembly constituency is numbered 317 amongst 403 constituencies.

Members of Legislative Assembly

Election results

2022

2017
Bharatiya Janta Party candidate Prem Sagar Patel won in last Assembly election of 2017 Uttar Pradesh Legislative Elections defeating Samajwadi Party candidate Shivendra Singh by a margin of 68,186 votes.

References

External links
 

Assembly constituencies of Uttar Pradesh
Maharajganj district